Bassem Raafat Mohamed Youssef (born 21 March 1974) is an Egyptian comedian, writer, producer, surgeon, doctor, media critic, and television host, who hosted El-Bernameg (The Show), a satirical news program, from 2011 to 2014. The press has compared Youssef with American comedian Jon Stewart, whose satire program The Daily Show inspired Youssef to begin his career. In 2013, he was named as one of the "100 most influential people in the world" by Time magazine.  Youssef's current projects are Tickling Giants,  The Democracy Handbook, and Revolution For Dummies.

Medical career
Bassem Youssef graduated from Cairo University's Faculty of Medicine, majoring in cardiothoracic surgery, in 1998. He passed the United States Medical Licensing Examination and has been a member of the Royal College of Surgeons (MRCS) since February 2007. He practiced as a cardiothoracic surgeon in Egypt for 13 years, until his move into comedy and political satirism. He also received training in cardiac and lung transplantation in Germany, after which he spent a year and a half in the US working for a company that produces medical equipment related to cardiothoracic surgery.
In January 2011, Youssef assisted the wounded in Tahrir Square during the Egyptian revolution.
Youssef has credited surgery for making him "a much harder working person, a nerd, a perfectionist."

Media career

The B+ Show (March 2011)
Inspired by the Egyptian revolution of 2011, Youssef created his first satirical show in March 2011. The initial idea came from his friend Tarek ElKazzaz. Entitled The B+ Show after his blood type, the program, at 5 minutes per episode, was uploaded to his YouTube channel in May 2011 and gained more than five million views in the first three months alone. The show was shot in Youssef's laundry room using a table, a chair, one camera, and a mural of amateur photos from Tahrir Square that cost $100. The show was a collaboration by Youssef with Tarek ElKazzaz, Amr Ismail, Mohamed Khalifa, and Mostafa Al-Halawany. Youssef used social media to showcase his talent and his show gave a voice to the millions of Egyptians who were seething with anger from the traditional media's coverage of the Egyptian Revolution.

Al Bernameg Season 1 (September 2011)
After the success of The B+ Show, Egyptian channel ONTV, owned by Egyptian billionaire Naguib Sawiris, offered Youssef a deal for Al Bernameg (literally, "The Program"). Youssef had planned to move to Cleveland to practice medicine but instead signed his show's contract. With a budget of roughly half a million dollars, the series made him the first Internet to TV conversion in the Middle East. The show, which consisted of 104 episodes, premiered during Ramadan 1432 (2011) with Egyptian-American engineer Muhammad Radwan as its first guest. In his show, Youssef has parodied such Egyptian celebrities as show host Tawfik Okasha, composer Amr Mostafa, Salafist presidential candidate Hazem Salah Abu Ismail, and Mohamed ElBaradei, former head of the International Atomic Energy Agency and onetime presidential candidate. The show became the platform for many writers, artists, and politicians to speak freely about the social and political scene. Al-Bernameg success inspired a number of amateur initiatives on various social media channels, who credit The B+ Show as their inspiration.

The Daily Show 2012
In June 2012, Jon Stewart invited Youssef to The Daily Show for an extended interview, "I do know a little something about the humour business; your show is sharp, you're really good on it, it's smart, it's well executed, I think the world of what you're doing down there", Stewart said to Youssef. The segment was one of the highest in viewership on The Daily Shows website.

Al Bernameg Season 2 (November 2012)
Following the success of The B+ Show on YouTube and the first season of Al Bernameg on ONTV, Tarek ElKazzaz convinced an old friend, Ahmed Abbas, to join QSoft as chief operations officer and Project Director for Al Bernameg with the mission of developing and upgrading the show into a multifaceted and global brand. This was done with the help of a team that covered many disciplines, including marketing, operations, legal and public relations. This all helped in developing both Bassem Youssef and Al-Bernameg on all levels and created a global audience. The show Al Bernameg was renewed for a second season after a contract with a second channel, CBC (Capital Broadcast Center), which premiered on November 23, 2012. The second season consisted of 29 episodes and has recorded one of the highest viewership ratings on both TV and internet with 40 million viewers on TV and more than 184 million combined views for his show on YouTube alone. Just three episodes into the show, several lawsuits were filed against Bassem Youssef and his show, mainly for "insult and defamation". On the season's premiere, Youssef made the owner and coworkers of his channel the subject of his show, as an assurance that he is granted full freedom of expression, and that no topic was off limits. CBC did not, however, air his second episode, which also featured further criticism of a TV show host who filed a lawsuit against Youssef. The show returned to its regular schedule for the third episode.

The program, which began with a small group working at home with Youssef, moved from ONTV's smallest studio to Radio theater in downtown Cairo, a theatre redesigned in the likeness of New York's Radio City, making it the first live audience show in the Middle East. The contents of a typical show's broadcast have evolved, which began with a sarcastic take on current political events, and eventually incorporating the hosting of public figures and stars from various fields, as well as various artists' performances.
In November 2012, Al Bernameg moved from ONTV's smallest studio to Radio Theatre in Cairo's downtown. Following the move, Youssef succeeded in increasing the show's worth by eight times in one year. The second season, which premiered in November 2012 on CBC network, was the first real live audience show in Egypt. The show gained tremendous success through its criticism of former Egyptian President Mohamed Morsi, representing the Muslim Brotherhood. Soon after the show started airing, complaints were filed against Youssef, accusing him of insulting Islam, Morsi and disrupting public order and peace.

Al-Shorouk
In March 2013, Bassem Youssef started writing a weekly column expressing his views for Al-Shorouk; one of Egypt's most prominent and independent daily newspapers.

Youssef also wrote newspaper columns, where he tackled taboo subjects such as atheism and questioning the commonly held view that apostasy from Islam should be punishable by death. On March 18, 2014, he faced plagiarism accusations by his readers, and through Twitter, by the original British writer, Ben Judah, who wrote the article for Politico magazine. He later published an apology in El Sherouk newspaper for initially publishing an article without citing any references.

America in Arabic
As Al Bernameg continued with its growing success, Jon Stewart appeared as a guest on the show in June 2013.

On 1 July 2013 America in Arabic (United Arab Emirates) debuted. He appeared for the second time on The Daily Show With Jon Stewart.

CBC stops airing Al Bernameg (October 2013) 
After a four-month break, Al Bernameg returned to air on CBC for its third series on 25 October 2013. The season premiere marked the first broadcast for the show since the 2013 Egyptian coup d'état had deposed Mohamed Morsi from the Egyptian presidency. Youssef criticised both the Morsi administration and the people's idolization of the Egyptian Defense Minister Abdul Fatah al-Sisi. The following day the CBC network issued a statement distancing the channel from the political stance taken by Youssef. The CBC network issued another statement, and decided to stop broadcasting Al Bernameg because of violations in the contract signed. Meanwhile, more than 30 complaints against Youssef and the show were filed at the General Prosecutor's office, accusing him of insulting the Egyptian Armed Forces and President Adly Mansour and describing the June 30 protests as a military coup, in addition to disrupting public order and peace. The General Prosecutor transferred some of the complaints for investigation, which were subject to the prosecutor's decision and judgment.

Al Bernameg Season 3 continues on MBC MASR
After terminating the contract with CBC, the production company behind Al Bernameg received offers from different TV channels. The third season was scheduled to air during the first quarter of 2014. In February 2014 it was announced that Youssef had signed a deal with the Middle East Broadcasting Center and that they would start broadcasting Al Bernameg from 7 February on MBC MASR satellite channel. Al-Bernameg achieved unprecedented weekly viewership ratings for 11 consecutive weeks. On one of the shows, Youssef mocked the Egyptian military's claims to be able to cure hepatitis C and AIDS.

In June 2014, after a six-week break during the 2014 Egyptian presidential election campaign, the Al-Bernameg team held a press conference where Youssef announced the termination of the show due to pressure on both the show and the airing channel. He felt that the political climate in Egypt was too dangerous to continue the show.

Life in the USA: 2014–present
In January 2015, Harvard's Institute of Politics (IOP), at the John F. Kennedy School of Government, announced that Youssef would be a resident fellow for the spring semester.

In February 2015, it was announced that Youssef was collaborating with The Daily Show producer Sara Taksler to launch a crowd-funding campaign for her documentary about his experience, Tickling Giants. Youssef stated that he couldn't say no to her request to do the documentary as, "at the time, she was working at The Daily Show, and I didn't want to say no to anybody working with Jon Stewart. So I basically said "yes" to be on his good side, but I discovered it didn't really make any difference".

In November 2015, Youssef hosted the 43rd International Emmy Awards in New York City.

In the fall of 2016, Youssef was a visiting scholar at Stanford University's Center on Democracy, Development and the Rule of Law (CDDRL). His research interests were stated as "political satire and its role in disrupting political, social and religious taboos."

In February 2016, it was announced that Youssef had reached a deal with Fusion to produce a digital series, Democracy Handbook with Bassem Youssef. The show premiered online and in a one-hour broadcast special in mid-July 2016.

Tickling Giants, a documentary film about Youssef directed by Sara Taksler, premiered on April 14, 2016, at the Tribeca Film Festival. John Oliver and Ed Helms were moderators for Q&As at screenings in Los Angeles. It became available for purchase in June 2017. The film is available for streaming on Netflix in 30 countries (excluding Canada and the US as of September 2019). It is not legally circulated in Egypt.

In 2017, Youssef guest-starred in the DuckTales reboot episode "The Living Mummies of Toth-Ra!" as the titular pharaoh.

The podcast Remade in America debuted In early 2018, in which Youssef explores the cultural, political, and social nuances of America from an outsider's perspective.

In June 2018, Youssef conducted his third Ask Me Anything on Reddit, having previously done so in 2017 and 2015.

In 2019, Youssef began the YouTube channel PlantBtv. His new online show combines his comedic, medical, and vegan background. It seeks to educate both Arabic and English audiences on nutrition and food science as it connects to health and wellbeing.

Youssef has done a variety of public speaking events in the US and Canada. He has also appeared on a variety of US media outlets. He has been interviewed for Full Frontal with Samantha Bee, has twice appeared on The Late Show with Stephen Colbert, and has been interviewed by Larry King and Trevor Noah. As of fall 2019, Youssef has regular standup comedy shows in San Francisco. His comedy for the western audience has a focus on immigration, refugees, terrorism, and the Arab experience in America.

Response of Egyptian government
On 1 January 2013, the daily Al-masry Al-youm reported that an Egyptian prosecutor was investigating Bassem Youssef on charges of maligning President Mohammed Morsi, whose office claimed that Youssef's show was "circulating false news likely to disturb public peace and public security and affect the administration."

Despite all of the controversy it sparks, Al Bernameg has been a major success. It is constantly topping the regional YouTube charts, making Bassem Youssef's YouTube channel the most subscribed to in Egypt.

On 30 March 2013, an arrest warrant was issued for Youssef for allegedly insulting Islam and Morsi. The move was seen by opponents as part of an effort to silence dissent against Morsi's government. Youssef confirmed the arrest warrant on his Twitter account and said he would hand himself in to the prosecutor's office, jokingly adding, "Unless they kindly send a police van today and save me the transportation hassle." The following day, he was questioned by authorities before being released on bail of 15,000 Egyptian pounds. The event sparked international media attention as well as a segment on Jon Stewart's The Daily Show in which he declared his support for Youssef, calling him a "friend" and "brother".

After Al Bernameg ended, the Egyptian police raided the offices of the production company, arresting several employees and confiscating their computers. According to Youssef, the police told producer Amr Ismail that they would continue harassing the company if Youssef did not stop speaking publicly at international conferences. The Egyptian courts then levied a E£50 million fine against Youssef in a contract dispute with CBC. In the verdict, the courts condemned satirical television shows and implied that Youssef was disrupting the peace and inciting public unrest. Fearing he would be arrested if he stayed in Egypt, Youssef fled to Dubai in November 2014.

Awards

In 2013, Youssef was named one of the "100 most influential people in the world" by Time magazine and one of Foreign Policy magazine's 100 Leading Global Thinkers.

In November 2013, Youssef's role in the media was recognized by the committee to Protect Journalists, which awarded him with the International Press Freedom Award, along with three other journalists.

In 2015, Youssef received an honorary degree and delivered the commencement address for the College of Online & Continuing Education at Southern New Hampshire University.

Al Bernameg was chosen by South by Southwest, one of the largest international interactive festivals, as the first and most successful internet to TV conversion story in the Middle East. Al Bernamegs YouTube channel was the first channel in the MENA region to reach one million subscribers and was awarded the gold button trophy.

Personal life

Youssef lives in the San Francisco Bay Area of California with his wife, an Egyptian-Palestinian, and their daughter, Nadia (b.~2012), and son, Adam (b. 2017). Youssef is a Muslim. When asked if he will ever return to Egypt and if he misses Egypt he has responded "no".

For 19 years he studied and worked in the field of medicine. He worked as a cardiothoracic surgeon when Al Bernameg was on hiatus. In his capacity as a doctor, he assisted wounded Tahrir Square protesters after the Battle of the Camel.

His favorite comedian is George Carlin.

In 2014, Youssef changed his diet to a whole-food, plant-based diet after realizing that his diet was the main reason for his feeling tired and lacking energy. Youssef is a proponent of yoga and pilates.

See also
 Television in Egypt
 Capital Broadcasting Center (CBC), a TV channel in Egypt
 MBC Masr
 ONTV (Egypt)
 OTV (Channel)
 Reem Maged
 Yosri Fouda

References

External links

Profile and articles at alarabiya.net
Articles on shorouknews.com (in Arabic)
AmericaBlAraby on YouTube (in Arabic)
Albernameg website 
Albernameg YouTube Channel
Appearances on C-SPAN
Bassem Youssef at Oslofreedomforum.com
 The Daily Show with Jon Stewart clip.

1974 births
Cairo University alumni
Egyptian cardiac surgeons
Democracy activists from Cairo
Egyptian dissidents
Egyptian humorists
Egyptian parodists
Egyptian satirists
Egyptian activists
Egyptian revolutionaries
Egyptian television presenters
Egyptian YouTubers
Egyptian Muslims
Living people
Physicians from Cairo
People of the Egyptian revolution of 2011
Mass media people from Cairo